Robert Moellering Fry (November 11, 1930 – November 10, 2019) was a former American football offensive lineman in the National Football League for the Los Angeles Rams and Dallas Cowboys.  He played college football at the University of Kentucky and was drafted in the third round of the 1953 NFL Draft.

Early years
Fry attended Elder High School before moving on to the University of Kentucky, where he was coached by Paul "Bear" Bryant. He was a part of the freshman basketball team that included Cliff Hagan and Frank Ramsey.

In 1950, he was named the starting offensive end as a sophomore and contributed to Kentucky's best season under Bryant, finishing with an 11–1 record and a 13–7 upset in the Sugar Bowl over the eventual national champions the University of Oklahoma, also ending the Sooners' 31-game winning streak.

As a senior, he was moved to the offensive tackle position and earned his second straight third-team All-SEC honors.

Professional career

Los Angeles Rams
Fry was selected by the Los Angeles Rams in the third round (36th overall) of the 1953 NFL Draft. He became a starter at left tackle as a rookie, before spending the next two years out of football while serving his military service.

He returned in 1956 and maintained his starting role for four straight seasons, even though at the time he was one of the lightest offensive linemen in the NFL.

Dallas Cowboys
Fry was selected by the Dallas Cowboys after being left unprotected in the 1960 NFL Expansion Draft, becoming the first starting left tackle in franchise history.

He was a starter on the left side of the line during the Cowboys first three seasons, until he lost his spot to Tony Liscio in the middle of the 1963 season and was moved to the right tackle position in place of Ed Nutting.

In 1964, he started five games at right tackle, after being passed on the depth chart by Ray Schoenke. On July 19, 1965, he was traded to the Cleveland Browns in exchange for a player to be named later.

Cleveland Browns
Fry retired after being released by the Cleveland Browns on August 29, 1965.

Coaching career
In 1967, after being the Atlanta Falcons' chief talent scout, he was named the assistant offensive line coach and eventually was promoted to offensive line coach.

In 1969, he joined the Pittsburgh Steelers as the offensive line coach.

In 1974, Fry began a nine-year stint as the New York Jets offensive line coach. He resigned in 1983 after the unexpected firing of head coach Walt Michaels, becoming the offensive line coach and offensive coordinator for the Atlanta Falcons.

References

1930 births
2019 deaths
Players of American football from Cincinnati
American football offensive tackles
Kentucky Wildcats men's basketball players
Kentucky Wildcats football players
Los Angeles Rams players
Dallas Cowboys players
Atlanta Falcons coaches
New York Jets coaches
Pittsburgh Steelers coaches
American men's basketball players
Elder High School alumni